Lothar Sieber (7 April 1922 – 1 March 1945) was a German test pilot who was killed in the first vertical take-off manned rocket flight, in a Bachem Ba 349 "Natter".

Before he became a test pilot for Bachem, he piloted an Arado Ar 232 in highly risky sorties. Shortly before his flight, he had become engaged to Gertrud Naudit, a Luftwaffenhelfer. Sieber had held the rank of second lieutenant but was demoted to private after an alcohol-related AWOL. Posthumuously he was promoted to Oberleutnant.

The first manned vertical-takeoff rocket flight

On 1 March 1945, at the Truppenübungsplatz Heuberg, Sieber entered the Natter Ba 349A M23 for the first manned vertical take-off of a rocket. The experienced test pilot was told to execute a half roll if the Natter should veer off course. The start worked as planned, with Sieber executing the roll maneuvers as soon as the Natter changed its course. After the release of the solid fuel rocket boosters it could be seen that the canopy came off and fell to the ground while the Natter disappeared into the clouds.

Eyewitnesses reported that the main engine kept firing. Soon, the Natter reappeared vertically from the clouds and hit the ground at high speed. All eyes searched for Sieber appearing with his parachute from the clouds, but to no avail.

Impact site 

At the impact site, about 7 km away, a 5 m deep crater was found, and except for half of a left arm and half of a left leg, only small body parts were found⁠, and later a 14 cm long part of a skull.

In 1998–1999, excavations found the remains of one of the Starthilfsraketen RATO rockets at the impact site, proving that it did not release from the fuselage of the Natter.

Lothar's remains are buried in a marked grave at Stetten am kalten Markt.

Aftermath 

Reconstruction of the flight, which lasted for 55 seconds and covered a horizontal distance of 7 km, calculated an average speed of about 800 km/h, thus about 14 km were traveled in total. 

Things went well at first, but one of the four jettisonable Schmidding boosters failed to release and the Natter went out of control. At 500 m (1,600 ft) the cockpit canopy pulled off as Sieber intended to bail out. He was instructed by radio to keep trying to shake off the booster, but inside the clouds he lost orientation as he presumably did not rely on the automatic radio guiding system which was designed to lead Natters with inexperienced pilots to the altitudes at which Allied bombers operated. The Natter probably turned on its back and flew horizontally rather than climbing, thus accelerating, which Sieber may have misinterpreted as a steep nose dive, pulling harder on the thrust rudder which made things even worse. Also, the brake parachute did not open due to the booster still being stuck. It is likely that Sieber understood his situation when the Natter left the clouds, and tried to bail out, but due to the high speed he managed only to get out with his left arm and leg before the violent impact.

As an experienced test pilot had failed to control the Natter, which was intended to be operated by many inexperienced pilots as an interceptor, the SS cancelled the project. The cause was officially explained as a failure of the canopy, which simply may have not been properly latched before launch.

Sieber's remains were buried with military honors on 3 March 1945.

See also 
 Early human rocket flight efforts
 Messerschmitt Me 163

Further reading 
Horst Lommel: Der erste bemannte Raketenstart der Welt, Motorbuch Verlag, 2. Auflage 1998, 
Horst Lommel: Vom Höhenaufklärer bis zum Raumgleiter - Geheimprojekte der DFS 1935–1945, Motorbuch Verlag, 1. Auflage 2000,

References

External links 
 Abfangjagdflugzeug Bachem Ba 349 "Natter"
 U.S. Intelligence Report Photos

1922 births
1945 deaths
Luftwaffe pilots
German test pilots
Military personnel from Dresden
Aviation pioneers
Aviators killed in aviation accidents or incidents in Germany
Victims of aviation accidents or incidents in 1945